Espen Hoff (born 20 November 1981) is a retired Norwegian professional footballer, born in Larvik. He is primarily a winger, but may also play as an attacking midfielder, whilst at Lyn he occasionally featured on the left wing. With 406 top division appearances, Hoff has made the sixth-highest number of appearances in Eliteserien.

Club career
Espen Hoff was signed from Odd Grenland before the start of the 2006 season in Norway. As a junior, he played for Larvik Turn, before moving to Skien and Odd Grenland in 1999.

At Odd Grenland, he scored 37 goals in 155 league matches, and additional 20 goals in 30 Norwegian Cup games. He also appeared in 6 European Cup games, without netting. He won the Norwegian Cup with Odd Grenland in 2000.

He signed for Tippeligaen Champions Stabæk in 2008 and from 2009 onwards he was a Stabæk player. He joined Start in 2010.

International career
Espen Hoff has been capped twice for his national side, making his début in a friendly against Bahrain on 25 January 2005. He was capped 27 times for the Norwegian U-21 team, scoring 3 goals.

Career statistics

Honours
Odd Grenland
Norwegian Cup: 2000

References
 Profile at lynfotball.net

External links

1981 births
Living people
People from Larvik
Norwegian footballers
Norway youth international footballers
Norway under-21 international footballers
Norway international footballers
Larvik Turn players
Odds BK players
Lyn Fotball players
Stabæk Fotball players
IK Start players
Eliteserien players
Norwegian First Division players
Association football midfielders
Sportspeople from Vestfold og Telemark